HSC Silvia Ana L (marketed as Silvia Ana) was a high-speed ferry owned and operated by Color Line on a route connecting Kristiansand, Norway to Hirtshals, Denmark. She was built in 1996 by Bazans Fernando Shipyard, Cadiz, Spain for the Uruguay-based Buquebus. She is the second largest one-fuselage high speed ferry in the world. It is now part of Buquebus.

History

The Silvia Ana L was delivered in December 1996 to Los Cipreres for Buquebus traffic between Buenos Aires, Argentina and Piriapolis, Uruguay. She was originally registered in Montevideo, Uruguay. In March–April 1997 the ship was upgraded in Cadiz, after which her home port was changed to Nassau, Bahamas. From that year onward she was chartered to Color Line between April and September each year, who used her on the Kristiansand—Hirtshals route. For the rest of the year she returned to Los Cipreres' Buenos Aires—Uruguay services. This arrangement continued until April 2000, when the ship was sold to MDFC Aircraft.

Following the purchase by MDFC Aircraft the Silvia Ana L but chartered to Color Line, who continued to operate her on the Kristiansand—Hirsthals route. Color bought the ship in 2005. In October 2007 the ship collided with M/S Stena Danica in Fredrikshavn harbour while en route to Örskov shipyard, Fredrikshavn. On 13 November 2007 the Silvia Ana L was sold to Buquebus, and is due to enter service with them on 12 December 2007. On 15 December 2007, the Silvia Ana L began work on the fast speed ferry service from Buenos Aires to Montevideo and Buenos Aires to Colonia del Sacramento.

References

External links 
Buquebus (Company website)

Ferries of Norway
Ships of Uruguay
Ships built in Spain
1996 ships